Elvinn Keo (born 18 May 1988 in Penang) is a Malaysian professional squash player. As of February 2018, he was ranked number 197 in the world.

References

1988 births
Living people
Malaysian male squash players
20th-century Malaysian people
21st-century Malaysian people